Slip forming, continuous poured, continuously formed, or slipform construction is a construction method in which concrete is poured into a continuously moving form. Slip forming is used for tall structures (such as bridges, towers, buildings, and dams), as well as horizontal structures, such as roadways. Slipforming enables continuous, non-interrupted, cast-in-place "flawless" (i.e. no joints) concrete structures that have performance characteristics superior to those of piecewise construction using discrete form elements. Slip forming relies on the quick-setting properties of concrete, and requires a balance between quick-setting capacity and workability. Concrete needs to be workable enough to be placed into the form and consolidated (via vibration), yet quick-setting enough to emerge from the form with strength. This strength is needed because the freshly set concrete must not only permit the form to "slip" by the concrete without disturbing it, but also support the pressure of the new concrete and resist collapse caused by the vibration of the compaction machinery.

In vertical slip forming the concrete form may be surrounded by a platform on which workers stand, placing steel reinforcing rods into the concrete and ensuring a smooth pour. Together, the concrete form and working platform are raised by means of hydraulic jacks. Generally, the slipform rises at a rate which permits the concrete to harden by the time it emerges from the bottom of the form.

In horizontal slip forming for pavement and traffic separation walls, concrete is laid down, vibrated, worked, and settled in place while the form itself slowly moves ahead. This method was initially devised and utilized in Interstate Highway construction initiated by the Eisenhower administration during the 1950s.

History 
The slip forming technique was in use by the early 20th century for building silos and grain elevators. James MacDonald, of MacDonald Engineering of Chicago was the pioneer in utilizing slip form concrete for construction. His concept of placing circular bins in clusters was patented, with photographs and illustrations, contained in a 1907 book, “The Design Of Walls, Bins, And Grain Elevators”.
 
In 1910, MacDonald published a paper “Moving Forms for Reinforced Concrete Storage Bins,”  describing the use of molds for moving forms, using jacks and concrete to form a continuous structure without joints or seams. This paper details the concept and procedure for creating slip form concrete structures. On May 24, 1917, a patent was issued to James MacDonald of Chicago, "for a device to move and elevate a concrete form in a vertical plane".

Silos
James MacDonald’s bin and silo design was utilized around the world into the late 1970s by MacDonald Engineering.

The former Landmark Hotel & Casino in Las Vegas was constructed in 1961 by MacDonald Engineering as a subcontractor, utilizing Macdonald’s concept of slip form concrete construction to build the 31 story reinforced steel tower.

Residential and commercial building
The technique was introduced to residential and commercial buildings already in the 1950s in Sweden. The Swedish company Bygging developed in 1944 the first hydraulic hijacks to lift the forms, which got patented. The first houses were built in Västertorp, Sweden, and Bygging became pioneers around the world with slip forming technique, from 1980 with the name Bygging-Uddemann. 

Residential and commercial building also was introduced in the late 1960s in USA. One of Its first uses in high-rise buildings in the United States was on the shear wall supported apartment building at Turk & Eddy Streets in San Francisco, CA, in 1962, built by the San Francisco office of Macdonald Engineering. The first notable use of the method in a residential/retail business was the Skylon Tower in Niagara Falls, Ontario, which was completed in 1965.  Another unusual structure was the tapered buttress structures for the Sheraton Waikiki Hotel in Honolulu, Hawaii, in 1969. Another shear wall supported structure was the Casa Del Mar Condominium on Key Biscayne, Miami, FL in 1970.

From the 1950s, the vertical technique was adapted to mining head frames, ventilation structures, below grade shaft lining, and coal train loading silos; theme and communication tower construction; high rise office building cores; shear wall supported apartment buildings; tapered stacks and hydro intake structures, etc.

In addition to the typical silos and shear walls and cores in buildings, the system is used for lining underground shafts and surge tanks in hydroelectric generating facilities. The technique was utilized to build the Inco Superstack in Sudbury, Ontario, and the CN Tower in Toronto. In 2010, the technique was used to build the core of the supertall Shard London Bridge tower in London, England.

References

External links 
 Slip-Form Construction Time Lapse - The Dalles, Oregon Retrieved 2014-04-22.
 Slipform
 MacDonald Engineering's slip form concrete grain silos

Bibliography
Nawy, Edward G. Concrete Construction Engineering Handbook. New York: CRC Press, 2008.

Construction
Civil engineering
Types of wall